Christopher Festarini (born June 3, 1993) is a Canadian ice hockey goaltender. He is currently playing with the Truro Bearcats of the Maritime Junior A Hockey League.

Festarini competed at the 2010 World U-17 Hockey Challenge where he won the Silver Medal as a member of Team Ontario.

Awards and honours

References

External links 

1993 births
Living people
Canadian ice hockey goaltenders
Erie Otters players
Niagara IceDogs players